Shorea elliptica (called, along with some other species in the genus Shorea, dark red meranti) is a species of tree in the family Dipterocarpaceae. It is endemic to Borneo.

References

elliptica
Endemic flora of Borneo
Trees of Borneo
Taxonomy articles created by Polbot
Taxa named by William Burck